"Boom Boom Baby" is a song written by Dave Burgess.
It became a number one hit in Australia when it was recorded by Crash Craddock in 1959. It was released on the Columbia label in the United States and was released on the Coronet label in Australia. The flip side of the record, "Don't Destroy Me", reached #94 on the charts in the U.S.

A 1998 song with the same name was released by The Ugly Americans.

Covers
The song was first recorded by Huelyn Duvall in either late 1957 or 1958, but not released until 1960 on Challenge Records.
Australian band Ol' 55 covered the song on their album, The Vault (1980).

See also
List of number-one singles in Australia during the 1960s

References

Billy "Crash" Craddock songs
Huelyn Duvall songs
1959 singles
Number-one singles in Australia
1957 songs
Columbia Records singles